The groove-toothed bat (Phoniscus atrox) is a species of bat in the family Vespertilionidae, the vesper bats. It is native to Indonesia, Malaysia, and Thailand. It is an uncommon species that depends on forests for survival, and it is threatened by deforestation.

References

Phoniscus
Bats of Southeast Asia
Bats of Indonesia
Bats of Malaysia
Mammals of Thailand
Least concern biota of Asia
Mammals described in 1905
Taxonomy articles created by Polbot